The women's 400 metres hurdles competition of the athletics events at the 2019 Pan American Games will take place between the 6 and 8 of August at the 2019 Pan American Games Athletics Stadium. The defending Pan American Games champion is Shamier Little from the United States.

Summary
Running unobtrusively on the outside, Anna Cockrell pushed out to an early lead down the backstretch.  Through the final turn Zurian Hechaverría asserted herself, pulling ahead, with Sage Watson the closes competitor over a stride behind.  Watson pulled even as they cleared the 9th hurdle, but upon landing Watson exploded ahead as Hechaverría was swimming in mud.  Rushell Clayton was the closest chaser as they ran for home, but she wasn't making up any ground on Watson's lead.  Watson went on to an easy victory in 55.16.  Cockrell made a late rush to nip Clayton at the line for silver.

Records
Prior to this competition, the existing world and Pan American Games records were as follows:

Schedule

Results
All times shown are in seconds.

Semifinal
Qualification: First 3 in each heat (Q) and next 2 fastest (q) qualified for the final. The results were as follows:

Final
The results were as follows:

References

Athletics at the 2019 Pan American Games
2019